Marina Ivanovna Volnova (born 26 July 1989 in Kzyl-Orda, Kazakh SSR, Soviet Union) is a Kazakhstani female amateur boxer.  She won the bronze medal in the Women's boxing middleweight 75kg category in the 2012 Summer Olympics.

References

External links
 

1989 births
Living people
People from Kyzylorda
Boxers at the 2012 Summer Olympics
Olympic boxers of Kazakhstan
Kazakhstani women boxers
Kazakhstani people of Russian descent
Olympic bronze medalists for Kazakhstan
Olympic medalists in boxing
Asian Games medalists in boxing
Boxers at the 2010 Asian Games
Boxers at the 2014 Asian Games
Medalists at the 2012 Summer Olympics
Asian Games bronze medalists for Kazakhstan
Medalists at the 2014 Asian Games
Middleweight boxers
21st-century Kazakhstani women